Bonny Light Horseman may refer to:

"Bonny Light Horseman" (song), a traditional folk song
Bonny Light Horseman (band), an American folk supergroup formed in 2019
Bonny Light Horseman (album), the 2020 debut album by the band

See also
My Bonny Light Horseman, a 2008 novel by L. A. Meyer